Thomas L. Lewis (1866 – May 1, 1939) was a miner and president of the United Mine Workers of America (UMWA) from 1907 to 1911.

He was born in Locust Gap, Pennsylvania, and worked in the mines as a boy. He later helped found the United Mine Workers in 1890.

He first ran for the presidency of UMWA in 1898 against John Mitchell, but withdrew before a vote could be taken. He became vice president of District 6 under William Green.  When Mitchell fell ill in 1907 and was unable to control the UMWA convention, Lewis led an attack on him and won the presidency.  He fought off challengers in 1908, 1909 and even Green himself in 1910, although he was forced to rig elections in the latter two campaigns.

Although Lewis stacked the organizing staff of the Mine Workers with his political supporters and turned the union's journal into a propaganda organ supporting his presidency, he did not retain leadership of the union after he signed regional wage agreements in 1909 and 1910 without the consent of the affected district presidents. He was defeated in 1910 by John P. White. He ran again for the presidency of the union in 1912, but lost.

After leaving the union, he became an anti-labor consultant for coal operators in West Virginia, published a coal operators' trade journal (the Coal Mining Review), and helped found the National Coal Association. According to Winthrop Lane, Lewis also served as Secretary of the New River Coal Operator's Association.  He died in Charleston, West Virginia, in 1939.

See also
 Michael Ratchford
 John Mitchell (United Mine Workers)
 John Phillip White
 John L. Lewis

References

Fink, Gary M., ed. Biographical Dictionary of American Labor. Westport, Ct.: Greenwood Press, 1984. 
Lane, Winthrop, Civil War in West Virginia: A Story of the Industrial Conflict in the Coal Mines, NY: B. W. Huebsch, Inc., 1921. 
Phelan, Craig.  William Green: Biography of a Labor Leader. Albany, N.Y.:  State University of New York Press, 1989.

External links
United Mine Workers of America

Trade unionists from Pennsylvania
American coal miners
Presidents of the United Mine Workers
People from Northumberland County, Pennsylvania
1866 births
1939 deaths